Thierry Bernasconi (born 3 September 1950) is a French former professional tennis player.

Bernasconi, a French junior champion, possessed a powerful serve and featured in all four grand slam tournaments during his career. In 1972 he was a quarter-finalist at the Queensland Open, upsetting Davis Cup players Colin Dibley and Patrick Proisy en route. He also made the quarter-finals at Manchester in 1973.

References

External links
 
 

1950 births
Living people
French male tennis players